Jeffrey Wayne Richmond (born January 7, 1961) is an American composer, director, and producer. He composed the music for, and directed multiple episodes of 30 Rock, a sitcom created by and starring his wife, Tina Fey. He also executive produced and composed the music for Unbreakable Kimmy Schmidt, another sitcom created by his wife. Richmond has won three Emmy awards for his production of the first three seasons of 30 Rock. He has also been nominated for an Emmy for his composition of 30 Rocks theme song. He was nominated for the Tony Award for Best Original Score in 2018 for Mean Girls.

Early life
Richmond grew up in Portage County, Ohio, and graduated in 1979 from James A. Garfield High School in Garrettsville, where he won the John Philip Sousa award and where his mother still lives. He also played a key part in the creation of the Garrettsville Community Players, directing, choreographing, and lending his creative and artistic vision to many of its shows in its beginning. He attended Kent State University in Kent, Ohio, in the late 1980s, where he co-authored a number of musicals, and wrote a musical score to William Shakespeare's Othello.

Career
Richmond worked at The Second City and Child's Play Touring Theatre before he became music director for the late-night television variety show Saturday Night Live. Richmond left SNL in 2006 to produce and compose music for the situation comedy 30 Rock.  Richmond has also appeared as an extra on various occasions on 30 Rock, as the character Alfonso Disparioso; and, beginning in 2010, he directed five episodes: "Argus", "Plan B", "The Ballad of Kenneth Parcell", "Today You Are a Man", and "A Goon's Deed in a Weary World".

In 2008, Richmond composed the score to the film Baby Mama, which starred his wife, Tina Fey, opposite Amy Poehler.

Richmond has also appeared in a recurring role on Late Night with Conan O'Brien as the short character of "Russian Hat Guy".

Richmond is a recipient of the Child's Play Touring Theatre 2012 Victor Award.

Richmond wrote music for the Broadway stage adaptation of Mean Girls, which had its out of town Broadway tryout in Washington, DC. The musical began previews on Broadway March 12, 2018, and opened officially on Broadway on April 8, 2018.

Personal life
Richmond is married to Tina Fey, the creator and star of 30 Rock. They met while working at The Second City and dated for seven years before marrying in a Greek Orthodox ceremony on June 3, 2001. They have two daughters.

Works

Television

Film

Stage

Web

References

External links

1961 births
Living people
21st-century American composers
21st-century American male musicians
American film score composers
American male composers
American male film score composers
American television composers
American television directors
Kent State University alumni
Male television composers
Musicians from Ohio
People from Garrettsville, Ohio